Daniel Henry Mueggenborg (born April 15, 1962) is an American prelate of the Roman Catholic Church who has been serving as bishop for the Diocese of Reno in Nevada since 2021.  He served as an auxiliary bishop of the Archdiocese of Seattle in Washington State from 2017 to 2021.

Biography

Daniel Mueggenborg was born in Okarche, Oklahoma, to Paul Bernard  and Dolores Lucille (née Kerntke) Mueggenborg. He received his early education at the parochial school at St. Francis Xavier Parish in Stillwater, Oklahoma, where he attended mass and served as an altar boy. Mueggenborg belonged to the Boy Scouts of America and received the Eagle Scout Award in 1980.

Mueggenborg entered Oklahoma State University (OSU) with to pursue a science degree. He later said that he was opposed to becoming a priest at that point. However, in the spring of 1981, he served at a mass in Oklahoma that was celebrated by Father Stanley Rother, a missionary serving in Guatemala. On July 28, 1981, Rother was murdered in Guatemala by a right-wing death squad. According to Mueggenborg, Rother's service and martyrdom for the church inspired him to pursue the priesthood. After graduating from OSU in 1984 with a Bachelor of Science degree in geology, he entered St. Meinrad Seminary in Saint Meinrad, Indiana.

Mueggenborg then entered the Pontifical Gregorian University in Rome. As a seminarian, he worked alongside the Missionaries of Charity to serve the poor in that city. Back in Oklahoma for a summer,  Mueggenborg volunteered as a hospital minister in intensive care units and cardiac wards at St. John Medical Center in Tulsa.  He spent a second summer in Mugumu, Tanzania, working alongside Maryknoll Missionaries. Mueggenborg was ordained to the diaconate on April 6, 1989, at St. Peter's Basilica in Rome; he was granted an audience the next day with Pope John Paul II at the Apostolic Palace in Vatican City.

Priesthood 
On July 14, 1989, Mueggenborg was ordained by Archbishop Eusebius Beltran to the priesthood for the Diocese of Tulsa at Holy Family Cathedral in Tulsa.  During his post-ordination year of studies in Rome, Mueggenborg served as a chaplain to the Missionaries of Charity convent at San Gregorio Magno al Celio in Rome; on one occasion, he celebrated a mass attended by the founder of the order, Mother Teresa.

After returning to Tulsa, Mueggenborg served as a chaplain at Bishop Kelley High School and as director of the Newman Center and professor of religion at the University of Tulsa.  He was also pastor of two parishes in Tulsa and one in Bixby, Oklahoma.  During a period in Rome, he assisted in seminary formation as vice rector of the Pontifical North American College. Additionally, Mueggenborg served on the boards of directors for Ascension Healthcare and Catholic Charities of Tulsa. Bishop Edward Slattery named Mueggenborg a monsignor in 2004.

Auxiliary Bishop of Seattle
Pope Francis appointed Mueggenborg as an auxiliary bishop for the Archdiocese of Seattle on April 6, 2017.  On May 31, 2017, he was consecrated by Archbishop J. Peter Sartain at St. James Cathedral in Seattle.

Bishop of Reno
On July 20, 2021, Pope Francis appointed Mueggenborg as bishop of the Diocese of Reno, succeeding Bishop Randolph Calvo.  Mueggenborg was installed on September 24, 2021.

Publications

Books
 Come Follow Me. Discipleship Reflections on the Sunday Gospel Readings for Liturgical Year C (Angelwing Publishing, 2015) 
 Come Follow Me: Discipleship Reflections on the Sunday Gospel Readings for Liturgical Year A (Angelwing Publishing, 2016) 
 Come Follow Me: Discipleship Reflections on the Sunday Gospel Readings for Liturgical Year B (Angelwing Publishing, 2017)

See also

 Catholic Church hierarchy
 Catholic Church in the United States
 Historical list of the Catholic bishops of the United States
 List of Catholic bishops of the United States
 Lists of patriarchs, archbishops, and bishops

References

External links
Roman Catholic Diocese of Reno
Roman Catholic Archdiocese of Seattle Official Site

1962 births
Living people
People from Okarche, Oklahoma
Oklahoma State University alumni
Pontifical Gregorian University alumni
University of Tulsa faculty
Catholics from Oklahoma
21st-century Roman Catholic bishops in the United States
Bishops appointed by Pope Francis